Who's Who in Scotland  is an annual biographical dictionary published since 1986 by Carrick Media. It features short biographies of about 5,000 notable Scots.

Who's Who in Scotland includes leading figures in politics, law, the churches, education, business and finance, the civil service and local government, science and medicine, the arts and sport.

Entries contain full name, address, date and place of birth, details of family, education, career, publications and recreations.

See also
Chamber's Biographical Dictionary
Who's Who
Dictionary of National Biography

External links
 Who's Who in the Scottish Government

1986 non-fiction books
1986 in Scotland
British biographical dictionaries
Scottish non-fiction literature
Series of non-fiction books